The 1976 United States Senate election in Florida was held on November 2, 1976. Incumbent Democratic U.S. Senator Lawton Chiles won re-election to a second term.

Republican primary

Candidates 

 John Grady, Mayor of Belle Glade
 Walter Sims, State Senator
 Helen S. Hanel, lawyer.

Results

General election

Candidates

Democratic
Lawton Chiles, incumbent U.S. Senator

Republican
John Grady, Mayor of Belle Glade

Independent 

 Ed Ice
 Timothy L. "Tim" Adams

Results
Chiles won in a landslide, dominating most geographic areas of the state. Grady won only Collier County.

See also 
 1976 United States Senate elections

References

Florida
1976
1976 Florida elections